Roorkee (Rūṛkī) is a city and a municipal corporation in the Haridwar district of the state of Uttarakhand, India. It is spread over a flat terrain under Sivalik Hills of Himalayas. The city is developed on the banks of Ganges Canal, its dominant feature, which flows from north–south through middle of the city. Roorkee is home to Asia's first engineering college Indian Institute of Technology Roorkee, formerly known as Thomson College of Civil Engineering. Roorkee is also known for the Roorkee Cantonment, one of the country's oldest military establishments and the headquarters of Bengal Engineer Group since 1853. A freight train ran in between Roorkee and Piran Kaliyar on 22 December 1851, this was two years before first passenger trains were started between Bombay and Thana in 1853 and 14 years after first freight trains ran in Chennai in 1837.

History

Roorkee is listed in the Ain-i-Akbari as a pargana under the sarkar of Saharanpur, producing a revenue of 12,234 dams for the imperial treasury and supplying a force of 1200 infantry and 125 cavalry.
After that it was a part of Landhaura Princely State of Pawaar Gurjar's till 1824 when the Britishers occupied it by defeating the First Freedom Fighter Vijay Singh.

Before 1840, the city was a tiny hamlet consisting of mud huts on the banks of the Solani rivulet. Digging work on the Upper Ganges Canal formally began in April 1842, under the aegis of Proby Cautley, a British officer. Local works were designed and overseen by the engineer Thomas Login. Soon, Roorkee developed into a town.

Col. P.T. Cautley, an officer in the British Army, was most instrumental in constructing the canal. According to Dept. of Hydrology the canal, which is still considered as a marvel of engineering, was built in 1853. However, water was released in the canal on 8 April 1854.

To look after the maintenance of the canal, the Canal Workshop and Iron Foundry were established in 1843 on the civil lines on the canal bank which is known as the Irrigation workshop nowadays. This was followed by the establishment of Civil Engineering School; classes started in 1845 to train local youth to assist in the civil-engineering work of the Upper Ganges Canal. This was to become the first engineering college established in India. On 25 November 1847, the college was formally constituted through a proposal by the Sir James Thomason, Lt. Governor of North-Western Province (1843–53). After his death in 1853, the college was rechristened as Thomason College of Civil Engineering. The college later upgraded to University of Roorkee in 1949; on 21 September 2001, through an Act of parliament, it was made one of the Indian Institutes of Technology, IIT Roorkee. In 1853 Bengal Sappers and Miners were stationed here which provided a controlling influence during the 1857 uprising. Other important events in the history of Roorkee include that under the Post Office Act of 1866, it was among the first few towns to have a post office and first telegraph office in the district. Now Roorkee has a General Post Office (GPO) and a number of post offices located in Roorkee City and Cantt. In 1886, Roorkee was placed on the Railway map of India. In 1907, first provincial trunk road Meerut-Roorkee-Dehradun was constructed. In 1920, Roorkee became the first town in Uttar Pradesh to have Hydroelectricity.

India's first aqueduct was constructed over the Solani river, near Roorkee, part of the Ganges Canal project, which itself was India's first irrigation work in North India, started by the British. In 1851, the Solani Aqueduct Railway was built by Proby Cautley in Roorkee to transport construction materials for Ganges canal. It was operated by the Bengal Sappers. A steam engine, Jenny Lind, (specially shipped from England moved on rails in India), pulling a freight train ran in Roorkee on 22 December 1851, between Roorkee and Piran Kaliyar,  from the city, two years before first passenger trains were started between Bombay and Thana in 1853 and 14 years after first freight trains ran in Chennai in 1837. A replica of what the locomotive is thought to have looked like is exhibited at Roorkee Railway Station.

The municipality of Roorkee was created in 1868. Now it is a Municipal Corporation. It had been home to the Bengal Sappers and Miners since 1853, and two artillery units were stationed there. Today, the Roorkee Cantonment has a large army base. The Bengal Engineering Group and Centre (BEG&C), are still there today.

In 1901, when the city had a population of 17,197, it was made headquarters of the Roorkee Tehsil, in Saharanpur district of the United Province of the British Raj; the tehsil included in it 426 villages (of the parganas of Jwalapur, Manglaur and Bhagwanpur) and six towns, most important among them being Haridwar and Manglaur. The Old Cemetery in the city is a protected monument, by the Archaeological Survey of India.

Geography

Before the creation of Uttarakhand on 9 November 2000, Roorkee was a part of the state of Uttar Pradesh.

The city is located in the Roorkee plain which is composed of recent alluvium with a gentle slope.

Climate
Roorkee has a monsoon-influenced humid subtropical climate (Köppen Cwa), typical of the northern Indo-Gangetic plain. There are three seasons. A sweltering, dry “hot” season begins in mid-March and extends until mid-June with steadily increasing humidity and discomfort. This monsoonal rain is accompanied by hot temperatures, very warm mornings, and extremely uncomfortable humidity. From early October the “cool” season begins as the monsoon retreats, featuring warm to very warm afternoons, cool mornings, and moderate humidity. Occasionally western disturbances between January and March will bring a little rainfall during this season, although the average total from October to March is only .

Demographics

The Roorkee Tehsil is the most populous among the three Tehsils in the Haridwar District with 45% of its population categorized as urban.  According to the 2011 census Roorkee city has a population of 345,00, within the area of 8.11 square kilometres. The average literacy rate of Roorkee is 89.48% The sex ratio of the town as-of 2011, is 863 for all age groups while between the age 0-6 it is 820.

Government and Politics 
For administrative purposes, the Roorkee city is part of the Haridwar district's Roorkee Tehsil. The city falls under the Roorkee Legislative Assembly constituency, which is one of the seventy electoral Uttarakhand Legislative Assembly constituencies of Uttarakhand state in India.

Civic Administration 
The governance of Roorkee city is done by the Roorkee Municipal Coorporation (RMC) which comes under Roorkee Metropolitan Region. The RMC is administered through the Uttar Pradesh Municipal Corporation Act 1959 which was adopted and amended by Uttarakhand. The act is  administered by the Urban Development Department (UDD), Government of Uttarakhand.

The council is formed every five years through ward councillors's elections and it holds the highest authority within the Urban Local Body (ULB) to make decisions. The council is headed by a Mayor, who is elected by the Ward Councillors from 40 municipal wards. A Municipal Commissioner (MC) is appointed by the state who is responsible for the operations of the ULB. The RMC is responsible for city related civic services like cleanliness of the city, solid waste management, maintenance of gardens/dividers/circles, street light, bio-medical waste, all storm water and wastewater drainage.

Politics 
The RMC has 40 wards with a voter population of 14.05 lakh voters- split between nearly 7.26 lakh men and 6.79 lakh women voters. The major political parties which are active in the local elections are Bhartiya Janta Party (BJP), Indian National Congress (INC), Bhartiya Lok Dal (BLD), Janta Party (JP), Lok Dal (LKD) and Samajwadi Party (SP).

Economy 
Roorkee is an industrial base of Haridwar district. It is partially industrialized. Its main industries are ship parts manufacture, surveying, drawing and mechanical instruments. It has a GDP of US$ 112 million.

Languages 
Major languages spoken in Roorkee are Hindi 72%, Urdu 23%, Punjabi 3%, and English 2%.

References

External links

 Roorkee biggest online directory is 

 
Cities and towns in Haridwar district
Cities in Uttarakhand